Urochloa mosambicensis, also known as sabi grass, gonya grass and bushveld signal grass is a species of grass that is native to southern parts of Africa.

References

Panicoideae
Plants described in 1931
Flora of Tanzania
Flora of Zambia
Flora of Zimbabwe
Flora of the Democratic Republic of the Congo
Flora of Mozambique
Flora of Malawi
Flora of Namibia
Flora of Botswana
Flora of Swaziland
Flora of South Africa
Flora of Madagascar